Suriname made its Paralympic Games début at the 2004 Summer Paralympics in Athens, sending two athletes (a man and a woman) to compete in the shot put. The country had a single representative in 2008 - a male sprinter. Suriname has never taken part in the Winter Paralympics, and has never won a Paralympic medal.

Full results for Suriname at the Paralympics

See also
 Suriname at the Olympics

References